Jigme Namgyal (also known as Jiming Nanjia) is the current vice-mayor of Lhasa. He is more concerned with the cultural preservation of Lhasa, than the growth-oriented mayor Doje Cezhug. However, he shares Cezhug's anti-Dalai Lama sympathies.

2008 riots
On the second anniversary of the riots, Namgyal delivered a response to a speech by the Dalai Lama, alleged by the Chinese government to have fomented the 2008 Lhasa violence. He said that the Lama was "a separatist who uses religion as a cloak", and reports that contrary to the Lama's allegations, the Buddhist monks in Lhasa are doing well, focused on improving their qualities of life.

Culture
He has helped to earmark 205 million yuan for the renovation of the Potala Palace and other major monasteries. All the government documents he issues are bilingual, in Chinese and Tibetan. Mr. Namgyal takes a relatively liberal stand on religious freedom: "In Tibet, people can believe whatever they want as long as it is legal. The government won't interfere. Instead it will help people solve problems along the way," he was quoted as saying.

References

Political office-holders in Lhasa
Living people
Year of birth missing (living people)